Sevenmile Creek is a  creek in Nashville, Tennessee. It begins at a pond near the intersection of Cloverland Drive and Edmonson Pike near Sterling Oaks in Nashville, Tennessee and is a tributary of Mill Creek. Via Mill Creek, the Cumberland River, and the Ohio River, it is part of the Mississippi River watershed.

See also
List of rivers of Tennessee

References

Geography of Nashville, Tennessee
Rivers of Tennessee
Rivers of Davidson County, Tennessee